Burgsalach is a municipality in the Weißenburg-Gunzenhausen district in Bavaria, Germany.

References

Weißenburg-Gunzenhausen